Aarada Gaaya is a 1980 Indian Kannada-language action film, written by M. D. Sundar and directed by V. Somashekhar. It was produced under the banner of Vijayashekar Movies. Shankar Nag, Gayatri, Sowcar Janaki and Kanchana appeared in pivotal roles. The music was composed by Chellapilla Satyam, with the lyrics of Chi. Udaya Shankar.

Cast

Shankar Nag as Mohan, Press Reporter
Gayatri
Vajramuni as Thammajji (Master), Mohan's Father
Sowcar Janaki as Judge
Kanchana as Mangalamma
Shakti Prasad as Malappa
Jai Jagadish
Thoogudeepa Srinivas
Tiger Prabhakar
Rajashankar
Dinesh
Jyothi Lakshmi
Jayamalini
N. S. Rao

Soundtrack
All songs were composed and scored by Chellapilla Satyam. The songs "Nanna Baala Baaninalli" and "Bidu Bidu Kopava" were instant hits upon release.

References

External links 

Arada Gaya

1980 films
1980s Kannada-language films
Indian action films
Films scored by Satyam (composer)
1980 action films
Films directed by V. Somashekhar